At the Mill Hill Playhouse is a dixieland revival jazz recording by the late clarinetist Kenny Davern and his quartet.

Track listing 
"I Want to Be Happy" (5:59)     
"Someday Sweetheart" (8:49)     
"It's Tight Like That" (6:46)     
"Wabash Blues" (9:14)     
"My Gal Sal" (7:22)     
"Wild Man Blues" (6:24)     
"My Blue Heaven" (7:31)     
"Lazy River" (7:18)     
"Diga Diga Doo" (6:31)

Personnel
Kenny Davern - clarinet
Greg Cohen - double-bass
James Chirillo - guitar
Tony DeNicola - drums

References

2003 albums
Kenny Davern albums
Dixieland albums
Dixieland revival albums
Arbors Records albums